This is a list of aircraft produced by Russian Aircraft Corporation MiG, previously Mikoyan, a Russian aircraft manufacturer.

Models

Other experimental projects and prototypes
 MiG I-210 (IKh) - MiG-3 re-engined with a M-82A radial engine, 1941; also known as MiG-9
 MiG I-211 (E) - high-altitude fighter prototype, refined I-210, 1943
 MiG I-220 (A) - high-altitude interceptor prototype developed from the MiG-3, 1943
 MiG I-221 (2A) - high-altitude pressurized interceptor prototype developed from the I-220 and powered by a twin-supercharged AM-39A inline engine, 1943
 MiG I-222 (3A) - high-altitude, high-speed pressurized interceptor prototype, 1943
 MiG I-224 (4A) - I-222 with improved air-air radiator and special high-altitude propeller, 1944
 MiG I-225 (5A) - high-altitude interceptor prototype, 1944; heaviest and most powerful of the I-220 family
 MiG I-230/MiG-3U (D) - improved MiG-3 powered by a AM-35A engine, 1942
 MiG I-231 (2D) - I-230 with AM-39 engine and all-metal fuselage, 1943
 MiG I-250 (N) - motorjet fighter prototype, 1945; erroneously known as MiG-13
 MiG I-270 (Zh) - rocket-powered interceptor prototype, 1947
 MiG I-300 (F) - prototype for MiG-9, 1946; MiG's first jet fighter design
 MiG I-301T (FT) - experimental two-seat trainer version of MiG-9, 1946; first Soviet aircraft with an ejection seat
 MiG I-305 (FL) - experimental version of MiG-9 powered by a Lyulka TR-1A engine, 1947
 MiG I-307 (FF) - prototype version of MiG-9 powered by afterburning RD-20F engines, 1947
 MiG I-308 (FR) - prototype version of MiG-9 with RD-21 engines and a pressurized cockpit, 1947
 MiG I-310 (S) - prototype for MiG-15, 1947
 MiG I-320 (FN) - single-engine, straight-wing version of MiG-9, MiG-15 predecessor, 1948
 MiG I-320 (R) - twin-engine, all-weather heavy fighter-interceptor prototype, 1949
 MiG I-330 (SI) - prototype for MiG-17, 1949
 MiG I-340/SM-1 - prototype version of MiG-17 with two Mikulin AM-5 engines, 1952
 MiG I-350 (M) - fighter prototype, 1951; first Soviet fighter to maintain supersonic speed
 MiG I-360/SM-2 - derivative of I-350, powered by Mikulin AM-5 engines, 1952
 MiG I-370/I-1 - swept-wing supersonic fighter prototype, 1955
 MiG I-3 family - fighter prototypes in the 1950s
 MiG I-7 - heavy interceptor fighter prototype developed from the I-3, 1957 
 MiG I-75 - swept-wing interceptor developed from the I-7, 1958; lost to the Sukhoi Su-9
 Ye-8 - supersonic jet fighter aircraft prototype, 1962; planned replacement of the MiG-21
 Ye-150 family - prototype interceptors in the 1950s
 MiG-AT - advanced trainer/light attack prototype, 1996; lost to the Yakovlev Yak-130
 MiG-105 Spiral - 1965
 MiG-110 - proposed cargo/passenger aircraft, 1995; not built
 MiG-2000 - ramjet-powered SSTO spaceplane, 1990s; lost to the Tupolev Tu-2000
 MiG MFI objekt 1.44/1.42 - 1986–2000
 MiG LFI project
 Mikoyan LMFS - proposed stealth light multirole fighter; developed into the Sukhoi Su-75
 Mikoyan Skat - stealth UCAV

Fictional
 MiG-28: a fictional aircraft flown by the antagonist in the 1986 film Top Gun. The real aircraft used to portray the MiG-28 was a Northrop F-5.

 MiG-31 Firefox: a fictional aircraft that appeared in Craig Thomas' novels Firefox and Firefox Down, as well as the 1982 film by the same name starring Clint Eastwood. The aircraft was portrayed as a Soviet interceptor with stealth capabilities, and had a thought-controlled weapons system. Its designation is shared with the real MiG-31 Foxhound.
 MiG-37 Ferret: a fictional Soviet stealth model aircraft, produced by the Testors Model Company, as a counter to the American F-19. The craft combined a faceted airframe design with cooled exhausts, and radar-absorbing skin. Purely conjectural, the design nonetheless turned out to be closer in shape to the actual F-117 Nighthawk.
 MiG-242: a fictional Soviet aircraft appearing in the 1968 pilot episode of Joe 90, a British Supermarionation television series co-created by Gerry and Sylvia Anderson

Naming conventions
MiGs follow the convention of using odd numbers for fighter aircraft. However, this naming convention is maintained not directly by MiG, but by ordering institutions, such as Ministry of Defence or Council of Ministers' Military-Industrial Commission (before the dissolution of the Soviet Union). The original designations for MiG aircraft are 2- or 3-digit numbers, separated by a dot. 1.44 or 1.42 is an example of the original naming. Although the MiG-8 and MiG-110 exist, they are not fighters. The MiG-105 "Spiral" was designed as an orbital interceptor, contemporaneous with the U.S. Air Force's cancelled X-20 Dyna-Soar.

References

Mikoyan
Russian Aircraft Corporation MiG